Solstad Church is a parish church of the Church of Norway in Bindal Municipality in Nordland county, Norway. It is located along the Bindalsfjorden in the village of Holm. It is one of the two churches for the Bindal parish which is part of the Sør-Helgeland prosti (deanery) in the Diocese of Sør-Hålogaland. The white, wooden church was built in a long church style in 1888 using plans drawn up by the architect Ole Scheistrøen. The church seats about 300 people.

History
The earliest existing historical records of the church date back to the year 1641, but the church was likely built long before that time. This old stave church was torn down in 1643 and replaced with a new church on the same site. Historically, this had been an annex chapel under the main Sømna Church on the other side of the fjord. Written records from 1652 state that the church had a rectangular nave and narrower, rectangular chancel, with a transept to the north or south and an entry porch for the main entrance. By 1666, the church was already described as being in poor condition. In 1734, the old, dilapidated building was torn down and replaced with a new church on the same site. The new building was a long church with an entry porch on the west end and a choir on the east end that also had a sacristy on the north side of it. As early as the 1760s, several repairs were carried out on the building. The new church was a long church design as well. After the new church was completed, the old church was disassembled and moved to the village of Lande in neighboring Brønnøy Municipality where it stands today as Tosen Chapel.

See also
List of churches in Sør-Hålogaland

References

Bindal
Churches in Nordland
Wooden churches in Norway
19th-century Church of Norway church buildings
Churches completed in 1888
14th-century establishments in Norway
Long churches in Norway